Archie Bradley may refer to:

Archie Bradley (baseball) (born 1992), American baseball pitcher
Archie Bradley (boxer) (1897–1969), Australian boxer and rugby league player